Homochitto National Forest is a U.S. National Forest in southwestern Mississippi comprising .  In the mid-1930s, the Civilian Conservation Corps (CCC) began reforestation of the area and developing a system of roadways and recreational areas.

Geography
In descending order of land area the forest is located in parts of: 
Franklin County, 
Amite County, 
Wilkinson County, 
Adams County, 
Jefferson County, 
Lincoln County, 
Copiah County

Flora and fauna
The flora of the Homochitto National Forest consists of about 850 species of vascular plants. The rivers and streams of the forest are rather poor in bivalve diversity, but at least eight species of freshwater mussels are known, with perhaps as many as 11 species possible. Three species of winter stoneflies have been collected from the Homochitto National Forest, including one that was later described as a new species, Allocapnia starki.

Headquarters
The forest is headquartered in Jackson, Mississippi, as are all six National Forests in Mississippi. There are local ranger district offices located in Meadville.

References

National Forests of Mississippi
Civilian Conservation Corps in Mississippi
Protected areas of Franklin County, Mississippi
Protected areas of Amite County, Mississippi
Protected areas of Wilkinson County, Mississippi
Protected areas of Adams County, Mississippi
Protected areas of Jefferson County, Mississippi
Protected areas of Lincoln County, Mississippi
Protected areas of Copiah County, Mississippi
Mississippi placenames of Native American origin